Blaze is the mascot of the University of Alabama at Birmingham's athletics teams.  He is a fire-breathing European dragon.  

UAB's athletic history goes back to 1977, when Gene Bartow was named the school's first athletic director.  In January 1978, a campuswide vote bestowed the nickname "Blazers" on the team, hoping that the teams would "blaze" a new trail in college athletics.  Originally, there was no official mascot, but that changed in 1995, when a European dragon was chosen as the mascot.  

On January 6, 1996, "Blaze" was introduced at a basketball game.  "Blaze" is considered a member of the spirit squads, and appears at all football and basketball games.  Blaze's head has appeared on the sides of UAB's football helmets since 1996, when the team moved up to Division I-A.

References
UAB chronology

External links
 Blaze's page at UAB's website

UAB Blazers
Dragon mascots
Conference USA mascots